RVG may refer to:
RVG (band), an Australian band formed in 2018
, a Spanish Bible translation based on the Textus Receptus
Rowena V. Guanzon, Filipina lawyer and politician
Radiovisiography
Rudy Van Gelder (1924–2016), American audio engineer
RVG, a cocktail involving Wray and Nephew's White Rum